Flying Dust 105H is an Indian reserve of the Flying Dust First Nation in Saskatchewan.

References

Indian reserves in Saskatchewan